The 2014 FINA Swimming World Cup was a series of seven, two-day, short course meets in seven different cities between August and November 2014. Mastbank was again the title sponsor for the series, with Omega serving as official timer.

Meets
The 2014 World Cup consists of the following seven meets:

World Cup standings
 Composition of points:
 Best performances (by meets): 1st place: 24 points, 2nd place: 18 points and 3rd place: 12 points;
 Points for medals (in individual events): Gold medal: 12 points, Silver medal: 9 points and Bronze medal: 6 points;
 Bonus for World Record (WR): 20 points.

Men
Official Top-20 Overall Scoring:

Women
Official Top-20 Overall Scoring:

Event winners

50 m freestyle

100 m freestyle

200 m freestyle

400 m freestyle

1500 m (men)/800 m (women) freestyle

50 m backstroke

100 m backstroke

200 m backstroke

50 m breaststroke

100 m breaststroke

200 m breaststroke

50 m butterfly

100 m butterfly

200 m butterfly

100 m individual medley

* Katinka Hosszú set a new world record of 57.25 seconds in the heats of this event in Doha, and another world record of 56.86 s in the heats in Dubai.

200 m individual medley

400 m individual medley

Legend:

Mixed 4x50m freestyle relay

Mixed 4x50m medley relay

NOTE: The mixed relay is not included in the overall scoring of the World Cup.

References

FINA Swimming World Cup
FINA Swimming World Cup